is a Japanese composer, record producer, and actor who has pursued a diverse range of styles as a solo artist and as a member of Yellow Magic Orchestra (YMO). With his bandmates Haruomi Hosono and Yukihiro Takahashi, Sakamoto influenced and pioneered a number of electronic music genres.

Sakamoto began his career while at university in the 1970s as a session musician, producer, and arranger. His first major success came in 1978 as co-founder of YMO. He concurrently pursued a solo career, releasing the experimental electronic fusion album Thousand Knives in 1978. Two years later, he released the album B-2 Unit. It included the track "Riot in Lagos", which was significant in the development of electro and hip hop music. He went on to produce more solo records, and collaborate with many international artists, David Sylvian, Carsten Nicolai, Youssou N'Dour, and Fennesz among them. Sakamoto composed music for the opening ceremony of the 1992 Barcelona Olympics, and his composition "Energy Flow" (1999) was the first instrumental number-one single in Japan's Oricon charts history.

As a film-score composer, Sakamoto has won an Oscar, a BAFTA, a Grammy, and 2 Golden Globe Awards. Merry Christmas, Mr. Lawrence (1983) marked his debut as both an actor and a film-score composer; its main theme was adapted into the single "Forbidden Colours" which became an international hit. His most successful work as a film composer was The Last Emperor (1987), after which he continued earning accolades composing for films such as The Sheltering Sky (1990), Little Buddha (1993), and The Revenant (2015). On occasion, Sakamoto has also worked as a composer and a scenario writer on anime and video games. In 2009, he was awarded the Ordre des Arts et des Lettres from the Ministry of Culture of France for his contributions to music.

Career

1970s
Sakamoto entered the Tokyo National University of Fine Arts and Music in 1970, earning a B.A. in music composition and an M.A. with special emphasis on both electronic and ethnic music. He studied ethnomusicology there with the intention of becoming a researcher in the field, due to his interest in various world music traditions, particularly the Japanese (especially Okinawan), Indian and African musical traditions. He was also trained in classical music and began experimenting with the electronic music equipment available at the university, including synthesizers such as the Buchla, Moog, and ARP. One of Sakamoto's classical influences was Claude Debussy, who he described as his "hero" and stated that "Asian music heavily influenced Debussy, and Debussy heavily influenced me. So, the music goes around the world and comes full circle."

In 1975, Sakamoto collaborated with percussionist Tsuchitori Toshiyuki to release Disappointment-Hateruma. After working as a session musician with Haruomi Hosono and Yukihiro Takahashi in 1977, the trio formed the internationally successful electronic music band Yellow Magic Orchestra (YMO) in 1978. Known for their seminal influence on electronic music, the group helped pioneer electronic genres such as electropop/technopop, synthpop, cyberpunk music, ambient house, and electronica. The group's work has had a lasting influence across genres, ranging from hip hop and techno to acid house and general melodic music. Sakamoto was the songwriter and composer for a number of the band's hit songs—including "Yellow Magic (Tong Poo)" (1978), "Technopolis" (1979), "Nice Age" (1980), "Ongaku" (1983) and "You've Got to Help Yourself" (1983)—while playing keyboards for many of their other songs, including international hits such as "Computer Game/Firecracker" (1978) and "Rydeen" (1979). He also sang on several songs, such as "Kimi ni Mune Kyun" (1983). Sakamoto's composition "Technopolis" (1979) was credited as a contribution to the development of techno music, while the internationally successful "Behind the Mask" (1978)—a synthpop song in which he sang vocals through a vocoder—was later covered by a number of international artists, including Michael Jackson and Eric Clapton.

Sakamoto released his first solo album Thousand Knives of Ryūichi Sakamoto in mid-1978 with the help of Hideki Matsutake—Hosono also contributed to the song "Thousand Knives". The album experimented with different styles, such as "Thousand Knives" and "The End of Asia"—in which electronic music was fused with traditional Japanese music—while "Grasshoppers" is a more minimalistic piano song. The album was recorded from April to July 1978 with a variety of electronic musical instruments, including various synthesizers, such as the KORG PS-3100, a polyphonic synthesizer; the Oberheim Eight-Voice; the Moog III-C; the Polymoog, the Minimoog; the Micromoog; the Korg VC-10, which is a vocoder; the KORG SQ-10, which is an analog sequencer; the Syn-Drums, an electronic drum kit; and the microprocessor-based Roland MC-8 Microcomposer, which is a music sequencer that was programmed by Matsutake and played by Sakamoto. A version of the song "Thousand Knives" was released on the Yellow Magic Orchestra's 1981 album BGM. This version was one of the earliest uses of the Roland TR-808 drum machine, for YMO's live performance of "1000 Knives" in 1980 and their BGM album release in 1981.

1980s
In 1980, Sakamoto released the solo album B-2 Unit, which has been referred to as his "edgiest" record and is known for the electronic song "Riot in Lagos", which is considered an early example of electro music (electro-funk), as Sakamoto anticipated the beats and sounds of electro. Early electro and hip hop artists, such as Afrika Bambaata and Kurtis Mantronik, were influenced by the album—especially "Riot in Lagos"—with Mantronik citing the work as a major influence on his electro hip hop group Mantronix. "Riot in Lagos" was later included in Playgroup's compilation album Kings of Electro (2007), alongside other significant electro compositions, such as Hashim's "Al-Naafyish" (1983).

According to Dusted Magazine, Sakamoto's use of squelching bounce sounds and mechanical beats was later incorporated in early electro and hip hop music productions, such as “Message II (Survival)” (1982), by Melle Mel and Duke Bootee; “Magic's Wand” (1982), by Whodini and Thomas Dolby; Twilight 22's “Electric Kingdom” (1983); and Kurt Mantronik's Mantronix: The Album (1985). The 1980 release of "Riot in Lagos" was listed by The Guardian in 2011 as one of the 50 key events in the history of dance music.

Among other tracks on B-2 Unit, "Differencia" has, according to Fact, "relentless tumbling beats and a stabbing bass synth that foreshadows jungle by nearly a decade". Some tracks on the album also foreshadow genres such as IDM, broken beat, and industrial techno, and the work of producers such as Actress and Oneohtrix Point Never. For several tracks on the album, Sakamoto worked with UK reggae producer Dennis Bovell, incorporating elements of afrobeat and dub music.

Also in 1980, Sakamoto released the single "War Head/Lexington Queen", an experimental synthpop and electro record, and began a long-standing collaboration with David Sylvian, when he co-wrote and performed on the Japan track "Taking Islands In Africa". In the following year, Sakamoto collaborated with Talking Heads and King Crimson guitarist Adrian Belew and Robin Scott for an album titled Left-Handed Dream. Following Japan's dissolution, Sakamoto worked on another collaboration with Sylvian, a single entitled "Bamboo Houses/Bamboo Music" in 1982. Sakamoto's 1980 collaboration with Kiyoshiro Imawano, "Ikenai Rouge Magic", topped the Oricon singles chart.

In 1983, Sakamoto starred alongside David Bowie in director Nagisa Oshima's Merry Christmas Mr. Lawrence. In addition to acting in the film, Sakamoto also composed the film's musical score and again collaborated with Sylvian on the film's main theme ("Forbidden Colours") – which became a minor hit. In a 2016 interview, Sakamoto reflected on his time acting in the film, claiming that he "hung out" with Bowie every evening for a month while filming on location. He remembered Bowie as "straightforward" and "nice", while also lamenting the fact that he never mustered the courage to ask for Bowie's help while scoring the film's soundtrack as he believed Bowie was too "concentrated on acting".

Sakamoto released a number of solo albums during the 1980s. While primarily focused on the piano and synthesizer, this series of albums included collaborations with artists such as Sylvian, David Byrne, Thomas Dolby, Nam June Paik, and Iggy Pop. Sakamoto would alternate between exploring a variety of musical styles and focusing on a specific subject or theme, such as the Italian Futurism movement.

As his solo career began to extend outside Japan in the late 1980s, Sakamoto's explorations, influences and collaborators also developed further. Beauty (1989) features a track list that combines pop with traditional Japanese and Okinawan songs, as well as guest appearances by Jill Jones, Robert Wyatt, Brian Wilson and Robbie Robertson.

1990s
Heartbeat (1991) and Sweet Revenge (1994) features Sakamoto's collaborations with a global range of artists such as Roddy Frame, Dee Dee Brave, Marco Prince, Arto Lindsay, Youssou N'Dour, David Sylvian and Ingrid Chavez.

In 1995 Sakamoto released Smoochy, described by the Sound On Sound website as Sakamoto's "excursion into the land of easy-listening and Latin", followed by the 1996 album, which featured a number of previously released pieces arranged for solo piano, violin and cello. During December 1996 Sakamoto, composed the entirety of an hour-long orchestral work entitled "Untitled 01" and released as the album Discord (1998). The Sony Classical release of Discord was sold in a jewel case that was covered by a blue-colored slipcase made of foil, while the CD also contained a data video track. In 1998 the Ninja Tune record label released the Prayer/Salvation Remixes, for which prominent electronica artists such as Ashley Beedle and Andrea Parker remixed sections from the "Prayer" and "Salvation" parts of Discord. Sakamoto collaborated primarily with guitarist David Torn and DJ Spooky—artist Laurie Anderson provides spoken word on the composition—and the recording was condensed from nine live performances of the work, recorded during a Japanese tour. Discord was divided into four parts: "Grief", "Anger", "Prayer" and "Salvation"; Sakamoto explained in 1998 that he was "not religious, but maybe spiritual" and "The Prayer is to anybody or anything you want to name." Sakamoto further explained:

In 1998, Italian ethnomusicologist Massimo Milano published Ryuichi Sakamoto. Conversazioni through the Padova, Arcana imprint. All three editions of the book were published in the Italian language. Sakamoto's next album, BTTB (1998)—an acronym for "Back to the Basics"—was a fairly opaque reaction to the prior year's multilayered, lushly orchestrated Discord. The album comprised a series of original pieces on solo piano, including "Energy Flow" (a major hit in Japan) and a frenetic, four-hand arrangement of the Yellow Magic Orchestra classic "Tong Poo". On the BTTB U.S. tour, he opened the show performing a brief avant-garde DJ set under the stage name DJ Lovegroove.

Sakamoto's long-awaited "opera" LIFE was released in 1999, with visual direction by Shiro Takatani, artistic director of Dumb Type. It premiered with seven sold-out performances in Tokyo and Osaka. This ambitious multi-genre multi-media project featured contributions by over 100 performers, including Pina Bausch, Bernardo Bertolucci, Josep Carreras, the Dalai Lama and Salman Rushdie.

2000s

Sakamoto teamed with cellist Jaques Morelenbaum (a member of his 1996 trio), and Morelenbaum's wife, Paula, on a pair of albums celebrating the work of bossa nova pioneer Antonio Carlos Jobim. They recorded their first album, Casa (2001), mostly in Jobim's home studio in Rio de Janeiro, with Sakamoto performing on the late Jobim's grand piano. The album was well received, having been included in the list of The New York Timess top albums of 2002. A live album, Live in Tokyo, and a second album, A Day in New York, soon followed. Sakamoto and the Morelenbaums would also collaborate on N.M.L. No More Landmine, an international effort to raise awareness for the removal of landmines. The trio would release the single "Zero Landmine", which also featured David Sylvian, Brian Eno, Kraftwerk, Cyndi Lauper, and Haruomi Hosono & Yukihiro Takahashi, the other two founding members of Yellow Magic Orchestra, amongst nearly one hundred other performers.

Sakamoto collaborated with Alva Noto (an alias of Carsten Nicolai) to release Vrioon, an album of Sakamoto's piano clusters treated by Nicolai's unique style of digital manipulation, involving the creation of "micro-loops" and minimal percussion. The two produced this work by passing the pieces back and forth until both were satisfied with the result. This debut, released on German label Raster-Noton, was voted record of the year 2004 in the electronica category by British magazine The Wire. They then released Insen (2005)—while produced in a similar manner to Vrioon, this album is somewhat more restrained and minimalist. They have continued to collaborate and have released two more albums: utp_ (2008) and Summvs (2011).

In 2005, Finnish mobile phone manufacturer Nokia hired Sakamoto to compose ring and alert tones for their high-end phone, the Nokia 8800. In 2006, Nokia offered the ringtones for free on their website. Around this time, a reunion with YMO cofounders Hosono and Takahashi caused a stir in the Japanese press. They released a single "Rescue" in 2007 and a DVD "HAS/YMO" in 2008. In July 2009, Sakamoto was honored as Officier of Ordre des Arts et des Lettres at the French embassy in Tokyo.

2010s–present

Throughout the latter part of the 2000s, Sakamoto collaborated on several projects with visual artist Shiro Takatani, including the installations LIFE - fluid, invisible, inaudible... (2007–2013), commissioned by YCAM, Yamaguchi, collapsed and silence spins at the Museum of Contemporary Art Tokyo in 2012 and 2013 Sharjah Biennial (U.A.E.), LIFE-WELL in 2013 and a special version for Park Hyatt Tokyo's 20th anniversary in 2014, and he did music for the joint performance LIFE-WELL featuring the actor Noh/Kyogen Mansai Nomura, and for Shiro Takatani's performance ST/LL in 2015.

In 2013, Sakamoto was a jury member at the 70th Venice International Film Festival. The jury viewed 20 films and was chaired by filmmaker Bernardo Bertolucci.

In 2014, Sakamoto became the first Guest Artistic Director of The Sapporo International Art Festival 2014 (SIAF2014).
On July 10, Sakamoto released a statement indicating that he had been diagnosed with oropharyngeal cancer in late June of the same year. He announced a break from his work while he sought treatment and recovery. On August 3, 2015, Sakamoto posted on his website that he was "in great shape ... I am thinking about returning to work" and announced that he would be providing music for Yoji Yamada's Haha to Kuraseba (Living with My Mother). In 2015, Sakamoto also composed the score for the Alejandro González Iñárritu's film, The Revenant, for which he received a Golden Globe nomination.

In January 2017 it was announced that Sakamoto would release a solo album in April 2017 through Milan Records; the new album, titled async, was released on March 29, 2017 to critical acclaim. In February 2018, he was selected to be on the jury for the main competition section of the 68th Berlin International Film Festival.

On June 14, 2018, a documentary about the life and work of Sakamoto, entitled Coda, was released. The film follows Sakamoto as he recovers from cancer and resumes creating music, protests nuclear power plants following the Fukushima Daiichi Nuclear Disaster, and creates field recordings in a variety of locales. Directed by Stephen Nomura Schible, the documentary was met with critical praise.

Production work
Sakamoto's production credits represent a prolific career in this role. In 1983, he produced Mari Iijima's debut album Rosé, the same year that the Yellow Magic Orchestra was disbanded. Sakamoto subsequently worked with artists such as Thomas Dolby; Aztec Camera, on the Dreamland (1993) album; and Imai Miki, co-producing her 1994 album A Place In The Sun. In 1996, Sakamoto produced "Mind Circus", the first single from actress Miki Nakatani, leading to a collaboration period spanning 9 singles and 7 albums though 2001.

Roddy Frame, who worked with Sakamoto as a member of Aztec Camera, explained in a 1993 interview preceding the release of Dreamland that he had had to wait a lengthy period of time before he was able to work with Sakamoto, who wrote two soundtracks, a solo album and the music for the opening ceremony at the Barcelona Olympics, prior to working with Frame over four weeks in a New York studio. Frame said that he was impressed by the work of YMO and the Merry Christmas Mr Lawrence soundtrack, explaining: "That's where you realise that the atmosphere around his compositions is actually in the writing - it's got nothing to do with synthesisers." Frame's decision to ask Sakamoto was finalized after he saw his performance at the Japan Festival that was held in London, United Kingdom. Of his experience recording with Sakamoto, Frame said:

Film work
Sakamoto began working in films, as a composer and actor, in Nagisa Oshima's Merry Christmas Mr. Lawrence (1983), for which he composed the score, title theme, and the duet "Forbidden Colours" with David Sylvian. Sakamoto later composed Bernardo Bertolucci's The Last Emperor (1987), which earned him the Academy Award with fellow composers David Byrne and Cong Su. In that same year, he composed the score to the cult-classic anime film Royal Space Force: The Wings of Honnêamise. Sakamoto also went on to compose the score of the opening ceremony for the 1992 Summer Olympics in Barcelona, Spain, telecast live to an audience of over a billion viewers.

Other films scored by Sakamoto include Pedro Almodóvar's Tacones lejanos (High Heels) (1991); Bertolucci's The Little Buddha (1993); Oliver Stone's Wild Palms (1993); John Maybury's Love Is the Devil: Study for a Portrait of Francis Bacon (1998); Brian De Palma's Snake Eyes (1998) and Femme Fatale (2002); Oshima's Gohatto (1999); and Jun Ichikawa's (director of the Mitsui ReHouse commercial from 1997 to 1999 starring Chizuru Ikewaki and Mao Inoue) Tony Takitani (2005).

Several tracks from Sakamoto's earlier solo albums have also appeared in film soundtracks. In particular, variations of "Chinsagu No Hana" (from Beauty) and "Bibo No Aozora" (from 1996) provide the poignant closing pieces for Sue Brooks's Japanese Story (2003) and Alejandro González Iñárritu's Babel (2006), respectively. In 2015, Sakamoto teamed up with Iñárritu to score his film, The Revenant starring Leonardo DiCaprio and Tom Hardy.

Sakamoto has also acted in several films: perhaps his most notable performance was as the conflicted Captain Yonoi in Merry Christmas Mr Lawrence, alongside Takeshi Kitano and British rock singer David Bowie. He also played roles in The Last Emperor (as Masahiko Amakasu) and Madonna's "Rain" music video.

Sports work
In 1994, Japan Football Association asked Ryuichi Sakamoto to compose the instrumental song "Japanese Soccer Anthem".

This instrumental song played at the beginning of Japan Football Association-sponsored events, such as Emperor's Cup matches.

Personal life
Sakamoto's first of three marriages occurred in 1972, but ended in divorce two years later—Sakamoto has a daughter from this relationship. Sakamoto then married popular Japanese pianist and singer Akiko Yano in 1982, following several musical collaborations with her, including touring work with the Yellow Magic Orchestra. Sakamoto's second marriage ended in August 2006, 14 years after a mutual decision to live separately—Yano and Sakamoto raised one daughter, J-pop singer Miu Sakamoto. He has lived with his manager and wife Norika Sora since around 1990 and has two children with her.

Beginning in June 2014, Sakamoto took a year-long hiatus after he was diagnosed with oropharyngeal cancer. In 2015, he returned, stating: "Right now I'm good. I feel better. Much, much better. I feel energy inside, but you never know. The cancer might come back in three years, five years, maybe 10 years. Also the radiation makes your immune system really low. It means I'm very susceptible to another cancer in my body."

On January 21, 2021, Sakamoto shared a link on his official pages, which contained a letter announcing that though his throat cancer went into remission, he was now diagnosed with rectal cancer, and that he's currently undergoing treatment after a successful surgery. He wrote: "From now on, I will be living alongside cancer. But, I am hoping to make music for a little while longer."

Activism
Sakamoto is a member of the anti-nuclear organization Stop Rokkasho and has demanded the closing of the Hamaoka Nuclear Power Plant. In 2012, he organized the No Nukes 2012 concert, which featured performances by 18 groups, including Yellow Magic Orchestra and Kraftwerk. Sakamoto is also known as a critic of copyright law, arguing in 2009 that it is antiquated in the information age. He argued that in "the last 100 years, only a few organizations have dominated the music world and ripped off both fans and creators" and that "with the internet we are going back to having tribal attitudes towards music."

In 2015 Sakamoto also supported opposition to the relocation of Marine Corps Air Station Futenma in the Oura bay in Henoko, with a new and Okinawan version of his 2004 single "Undercooled" whose sales partially contributed to the "Henoko Fund", aimed to stop the relocation of the base on Okinawa.

Commmons

In 2006 Sakamoto, in collaboration with Japanese music company Avex Group, founded , a record label seeking to change the manner in which music is produced. Sakamoto has explained that Commmons is not his label, but is a platform for all aspiring artists to join as equal collaborators to share the benefits of the music industry. On the initiative's "About" page, the label is described as a project that "aims to find new possibilities for music, while making meaningful contribution to culture and society". The name "Commmons" is spelt with three "m"s because the third "m" stands for music.

Awards and nominations
Sakamoto has won a number of awards for his work as a film composer, beginning winning the BAFTA Award for Best Film Music with his score for Merry Christmas, Mr. Lawrence (1983). His greatest award success was for scoring The Last Emperor (1987), which won him the Academy Award for Best Original Score, Golden Globe Award for Best Original Score, and Grammy Award for Best Score Soundtrack Album for a Motion Picture, Television or Other Visual Media, as well as a BAFTA nomination.

His score for The Sheltering Sky (1990) won him his second Golden Globe Award, and his score for Little Buddha (1993) received another Grammy Award nomination. In 1997, his collaboration with Toshio Iwai, Music Plays Images X Images Play Music, was awarded the Golden Nica, the grand prize of the Prix Ars Electronica competition. He also contributed to the Academy Award winning soundtrack for Babel (2006) with several pieces of music, including the closing theme "Bibo no Aozora". In 2009, he was awarded the Ordre des Arts et des Lettres from France's Ministry of Culture for his musical contributions. His score for The Revenant (2015) was nominated for the Golden Globe and BAFTA, and won Best Musical Score from the Dallas–Fort Worth Film Critics Association.

The music video for "Risky", written and directed by Meiert Avis, also won the first ever MTV "Breakthrough Video Award". The ground breaking video explores transhumanist philosopher FM-2030's (Persian: فریدون اسفندیاری) ideas of "Nostalgia for the Future", in the form of an imagined love affair between a robot and one of Man Ray's models in Paris in the late 1930s. Additional inspiration was drawn from Jean Baudrillard, Edvard Munch's 1894 painting  "Puberty", and Roland Barthes "Death of the Author". The surrealist black and white video uses stop motion, light painting, and other retro in-camera effects techniques. Meiert Avis shot Sakamoto while at work on the score for "The Last Emperor" in London. Sakamoto also appears in the video painting words and messages to an open shutter camera. Iggy Pop, who performs the vocals on "Risky", chose not to appear in the video, allowing his performance space to be occupied by the surrealist era robot.

Sakamoto won the Golden Pine Award (Lifetime Achievement) at the 2013 International Samobor Film Music Festival, along with Clint Eastwood and Gerald Fried.

Honorary awards
 2009 – Ordre des Arts et des Lettres, from France's Ministry of Culture
 2013 – Golden Pine Award (Lifetime Achievement), at 2013 International Samobor Film Music Festival

Soundtrack awards

Academy Award for Best Original Score
 1987 – The Last Emperor (won)

BAFTA Award for Best Film Music
 1983 – Merry Christmas, Mr. Lawrence (won)
 1987 – The Last Emperor (nominated)
 2015 – The Revenant (nominated)

Grand Bell Awards for Best Music
 2018  – The Fortress (won)

Golden Globe Award for Best Original Score
 1987 – The Last Emperor (won)
 1990 – The Sheltering Sky (won)
 1993 – Little Buddha (nominated)
 2015 – The Revenant (nominated)

Grammy Award for Best Score Soundtrack Album for a Motion Picture, Television or Other Visual Media
 1987 – The Last Emperor (won)
 1995 – Little Buddha (nominated)
 2015 – The Revenant (nominated)

Other awards
 1997 – Golden Nica, grand prize of Prix Ars Electronica, for Music Plays Images X Images Play Music
 MTV Breakthrough Video Award, for music video of "Risky"

Discography

Solo studio albums

 Thousand Knives (1978)
 B-2 Unit (1980)
 Left-Handed Dream (1981)
 Ongaku Zukan (1984)
 Esperanto (1985)
 Futurista (1986)
 Illustrated Musical Encyclopedia (1986)
 Neo Geo (1987)
 Beauty (1989)
 Heartbeat (1991)
 Sweet Revenge (1994)
 Smoochy (1995)
 1996 (1996)
 Discord (1997)
 BTTB (1999)
 Comica (2002)
 Elephantism (2002)
 Chasm (2004)
 Out of Noise (2009)
 Playing the Piano (2009)
 Three (2013)
 Async (2017)
 12 (2023)

Notes

References

Further reading

External links

 
 Commmons – Sakamoto's record label
 Raster-Noton
 
 
 

1952 births
20th-century classical composers
20th-century classical pianists
20th-century Japanese composers
20th-century Japanese male actors
20th-century Japanese male musicians
21st-century classical composers
21st-century classical pianists
21st-century Japanese composers
21st-century Japanese male actors
21st-century Japanese male musicians
Anime composers
Avex Group artists
Avex Group people
Best Original Music BAFTA Award winners
Best Original Music Score Academy Award winners
Composers for piano
Electronic composers
Golden Globe Award-winning musicians
Grammy Award winners
Intellectual property activism
Island Records artists
Japanese anti–nuclear power activists
Japanese classical composers
Japanese classical pianists
Japanese contemporary artists
Japanese contemporary classical composers
Japanese dance musicians
Japanese electro musicians
Japanese electronic musicians
Japanese film score composers
Japanese house musicians
Japanese keyboardists
Japanese male classical composers
Japanese male classical pianists
Japanese male film actors
Japanese male film score composers
Japanese male television actors
Japanese opera composers
Japanese record producers
Japanese techno musicians
Japanese trance musicians
Living people
Male opera composers
Musicians from Tokyo
New-age composers
New-age musicians
Progressivism in Japan
Samadhi Sound artists
Tokyo University of the Arts alumni
Video game composers
Virgin Records artists
Yellow Magic Orchestra members